Graham Waterhouse, cellist and composer especially of chamber music, has written a number of song cycles. As a cellist, he has used string instruments or a Pierrot ensemble instead of the typical piano to accompany a singer. In 2003 he composed a first cycle of songs based on late poems by Friedrich Hölderlin. In 2016, he set nursery rhymes, excerpts from James Joyce, and texts by Shakespeare. In  2017, he wrote settings of poems by Irish female writers, and in 2022 a cycle of Buddhist texts for mezzo-soprano, cello and piano.

Overview 
The following table contains for every song cycle the title with translation, the year of composition, the text source and its language(s), voice type (soprano, mezzo-soprano, tenor) and instrument or ensemble, and the number of movements. When ensemble is mentioned, it is always the Pierrot ensemble which Arnold Schönberg introduced in his Pierrot Lunaire of 1912: flute, clarinet, violin, cello, piano and percussion.

Sechs späteste Lieder 

The cycle, composed in 2003, sets six of the late poems by Hölderlin for mezzo-soprano voice and cello in seven movements, with a prelude by the cello, and the final poem spoken as a melodrama:
 Vorspiel (Cello)
 Das Angenehme dieser Welt
 Nicht alle Tage
 Der Winter
 Die Aussicht
 Der Herbst
 Auf den Tod eines Kindes

It was performed and live recorded at the Gasteig in Munich by Martina Koppelstetter and the composer on 11 April 2010, in a composer's portrait concert, along with chamber music, early songs and the premiere of the setting of the poem Im Gebirg (On the Mountains) by Hans Krieger, scored for mezzo-soprano, alto flute and piano.

Moonbass 

The cycle is a setting of three medieval poems in different languages, for soprano and cello. It was composed for a colloquium at the University of Oldenburg with Violeta Dinescu.

 He Lune! (Christine de Pisan, 1365–1430)
 Man in the Moon (anon., translated from Old English by J. Draycott)
 Der Tunkel Sterne (Der von Kürenberg, c. 1150–1170)

It was premiered on 28 November 2014 by Stephanie Kühne and the composer.

De Natura 

De Natura (Of Nature) is a song cycle for tenor and string quartet. The texts have in common that they deal with phenomena of nature.

 Hymn to Helios (anon., 1st century BC)
 The Moon (Charles Best, 1608)
 On a Nightingale in April (William Sharp, c. 1890)
 The Amphisbaena (A. E. Housman, c. 1920)
 Saint Hugh (Thomas Dekker, c. 1630)

It was premiered at the Gasteig on 1 November 2015 by tenor Colin Howard and a string quartet formed by Joe Rappaport, Lorenz Chen, Dorothea Galler and the composer.

Hinx Minx 

The cycle of settings of six nursery rhymes from the Oxford Dictionary of Nursery Rhymes was composed for a concert for children on the Museumsinsel Hombroich, performed on 28 February 2016 by Eva Vogel, mezzo-soprano, and the composer as the cellist.
 Sing, sing
 Anna Elise
 Hector Protector
 Hinx, Minx
 Solomon Grundy
 Chinese counting

Music of Sighs 

The texts for the cycle are all by James Joyce; Arise from Chamber Music (No. 14) is framed by two excerpt from Finnegans Wake:
 Bulbulone
 Arise
 Buzzard

Scored for mezzo-soprano and ensemble, the cycle was first performed at the Gasteig on 24 April 2016 by Julia Kraushaar and the Ensemble Blauer Reiter.

Drei Lieder nach Shakespeare 

Waterhouse set three songs by Shakespeare from his play The Tempest for soprano and string quartet, to be first performed in an homage concert for Shakespeare, ... play fast and loose ..., at the Gasteig on 9 October 2016 by Anna Karmasin and the Pelaar Quartet:

 Say my Spirit
 Where the Bee sucks
 Juno and Ceres

Irish Phoenix 

The cycle is based on poems by Irish women writers from the 8th to the 21st century. It is scored for soprano and an instrumental ensemble matching Anton Webern's arrangement of Schönberg's first Chamber Symphony, Op. 9: flute (doubling piccolo), clarinet (doubling bass clarinet), violin, cello, piano and percussion. Settings of seven poems and an interlude form the cycle:

 Eve (anon, 8th century)
 News (Colette Nic Aodha)
 The Spring (Katharine Tynan)
 Song (Rebecca Scott, 1870)
 Interlude
 Small Breaths (Eileen Hulme, 1990)
 The Poetry Bug (Colette Bryce, early 21st century)
 The Irish Phoenix (anon, 18th century)

It was first performed by Anna Karmasin and the ensemble Blauer Reiter at the Gasteig on 1 April 2017.

Shravana 

The cycle Shravana for mezzo-soprano, cello and piano is music in five movements for different combinations of the three performers, all with Buddhist overtones.
 Gate Paragate
 Om Tare
 Vajrakilaya
 Vokalise
 Vaidurya

It was first performed at the Gasteig on 12 March 2022 by Anna-Doris Capitelli, the composer and Miku Nishimoto-Neubert.

References

External links 
 Works List

Chamber music by Graham Waterhouse
Contemporary classical compositions
Classical song cycles in English
Classical song cycles in German
2003 compositions
2014 compositions
2015 compositions
2016 compositions
2017 compositions
2022 compositions
Musical settings of poems by Friedrich Hölderlin
Music based on works by William Shakespeare